John Talbot, 1st Earl Talbot (25 February 1749 – 19 May 1793), known as John Talbot until 1782 and as The Lord Talbot between 1782 and 1784, was a British peer and politician.

Background

A member of Talbot family headed by the Earl of Shrewsbury, Talbot was the son of John Talbot, younger son of Charles Talbot, 1st Baron Talbot, and his wife Catherine, daughter of John Chetwynd, 2nd Viscount Chetwynd.

Political career
Talbot was returned to Parliament for Castle Rising in 1777, a seat he held until 1782, when he succeeded his uncle, William Talbot, 1st Earl Talbot, as third Baron Talbot and entered the House of Lords. In 1784 the earldom of Talbot which had become extinct on his uncle's death was revived when Talbot was created Viscount of Ingestre, in the County of Stafford, and Earl Talbot, of Hensol in the County of Glamorgan. Two years later he assumed by Royal licence the additional surname and arms of Chetwynd, having inherited Ingestre Hall via his mother from the Chetwynd family.

Family
Lord Talbot married Lady Charlotte, daughter of Wills Hill, 1st Marquess of Downshire, in 1776. A portrait of Talbot was painted by Pompeo Batoni while there are portraits of his wife by both Sir Joshua Reynolds (1783; now in Tate Britain) and by Thomas Gainsborough and John Hoppner (1788; now in the Dunedin Public Art Gallery). Lord Talbot died at Fairford, Gloucestershire, in May 1793, aged 44, and was succeeded in his titles by his eldest son, Charles, whose son Henry succeeded as Earl of Shrewsbury in 1858. The Countess Talbot died in January 1804.

Ancestry

References

1749 births
1793 deaths
Earls Talbot
John Talbot
Members of the Parliament of Great Britain for English constituencies
British MPs 1774–1780
British MPs 1780–1784
Barons Talbot